Underdog Alma Mater is the debut studio album by American pop punk band Forever the Sickest Kids. It was released on April 29, 2008 by Universal Motown.

Composition
Many of the songs from Underdog Alma Mater had already been released in the band's previous EPs.

The band's very first EP, Television Off, Party On, featured the tracks "Believe Me, I'm Lying", "She's a Lady", and "Breakdown". However, these tracks have a significantly different sound to them in their respective recordings from the EP and Underdog Alma Mater. On the band's release, The Sickest Warped Tour EP, "Hey Brittany" and "Coffee Break" were featured on it, but were also different from their respective recorded versions on the album. Unlike the other songs, on the band's EP, Hot Party Jamz, the track "That for Me" was featured, but its recording remained the same as it was on the album.

During the writing of the songs for the album, guitarist Marc Stewart stated, "Our songs are about real stuff that's happened to us because that's what kids want to hear about. They want to listen to stories about things that could happen to them as well, or that already have happened to them."

The track "Believe Me, I'm Lying", written by Austin Bello and Caleb Turman, is based on how Turman once ran into trouble with his girlfriend after he lied to her and left her in tears. Turman stated, "I was hanging out with some other girls, but I told my girlfriend that I was going out by myself. So, the girls and I decided to get some coffee, and as we're walking to the car, my girlfriend pulled up and her headlights were right there in my face. I was totally busted."

"Believe Me, I'm Lying" and the track "My Worst Nightmare" were both written by Bello and Turman and both tracks had originally descended from the duo's former acoustic/electronic project Been Bradley. The original recordings of these two songs are featured on the deluxe edition of Underdog Alma Mater.

Release
Between mid-March and early May 2008, the band participated in the Alternative Press Tour. On April 10, a music video was released for "Whoa Oh! (Me vs. Everyone)". Underdog Alma Mater was released on April 29 through Universal Motown Records. The album was made available for streaming on May 2 through Imeem. A couple of days later, the band appeared at the 2008 edition of the Bamboozle festival. Also in May, the group went on a US tour alongside Metro Station, the Maine, the Cab and Danger Radio. Between June and August, the band performed on the 2008 edition of Warped Tour. On September 23, a music video was released for "She's a Lady". In October and November, the band supported Cobra Starship on their Sassy Back (Tour) in the US.

On February 4, 2009, the band posted a cover of Taylor Swift's "Love Story" online. Later in February, the band went on a tour of Europe, followed by appearances at Soundwave festival in Australia and a tour of Japan, ending in early March. In April, the band performed on the Bamboozle Roadshow and appeared at The Bamboozle festival in early May. Between late June and late August, the band performed on the Warped Tour. On July 7, the deluxe edition of the album was released. It featured the twelve original songs from the album and seventeen additional tracks from the band, mainly from the band's earlier days. A DVD with live shows and other footage was also included, as well.

Promotion
Fans would receive special bonuses by pre-ordering the album from certain retailers.
Best Buy
Two bonus tracks: "Give & Take (remix)" and "Hurricane Haley"
A bonus live video of the band's full set at SXSW
Interpunk
Button, sticker, and signed poster
iTunes (digital download)
Two bonus tracks: "Becky Starz (remix)" and "Indiana"
Newbury Comics
Signed CD booklet
SmartPunk
Autographed poster

Track listing

Personnel

Forever the Sickest Kids
 Jonathan Cook – vocals
 Austin Bello – bass guitar, vocals
 Caleb Turman – rhythm guitar, vocals
 Marc Stewart – lead guitar
 Kent Garrison – keyboards, synthesizers
 Kyle Burns – drums, percussion

Additional
 Tom Coyne – mastering
 Tom Lord-Alge – mixing
 Shep Goodman – A&R
 Evan Hunt – photography
 Cover concept and Underdog Alma Mater emblem illustration by Kyle Burns

Chart performance

References

Forever the Sickest Kids albums
2008 debut albums
Universal Motown Records albums
Albums produced by Matt Squire